Kirby High School may refer to:
 Kirby High School (Arkansas) in Kirby, Arkansas.
 Kirby High School (Tennessee) in Memphis, Tennessee.
Kirby High School Woodville, Texas